Bahcall is a surname. Notable people with the name include:

John N. Bahcall (1934–2005), American astrophysicist
Neta Bahcall (born 1942), Israeli astrophysicist and cosmologist 
Safi Bahcall (born 1968), American technology executive and author

See also
Bacall (surname)
Bakal (disambiguation)